Guram Minashvili (25 November 1936 – 1 March 2015) was a Georgian basketball player who competed for the Soviet Union in the 1960 Summer Olympics.

References

External links

1936 births
2015 deaths
Burials at Didube Pantheon
Basketball players from Tbilisi
Men's basketball players from Georgia (country)
Soviet men's basketball players
1959 FIBA World Championship players
1963 FIBA World Championship players
Olympic basketball players of the Soviet Union
Basketball players at the 1960 Summer Olympics
Olympic silver medalists for the Soviet Union
FIBA EuroBasket-winning players
Olympic medalists in basketball
Medalists at the 1960 Summer Olympics